Lewiston is an unincorporated community in Spotsylvania County, in the U.S. state of Virginia.

References

Unincorporated communities in Virginia
Unincorporated communities in Spotsylvania County, Virginia